Tom Woods (born April 7, 1953) is a retired male high jumper from the United States, who competed in the 1970s for his native country. He set his personal best in the men's high jump event (2.27 metres) on 1975-06-20 in Eugene, Oregon, winning the national title.

Achievements

References
Profile

1953 births
Living people
American male high jumpers
Athletes (track and field) at the 1975 Pan American Games
Pan American Games medalists in athletics (track and field)
Pan American Games gold medalists for the United States
Medalists at the 1975 Pan American Games